is a role-playing video game developed by Gust, and originally released in Japan for the PlayStation 4, Nintendo Switch and Microsoft Windows in September 2019. It was released in North America in October 2019 and rest of the world in November 2019 for the same consoles. It is the twenty-first main entry in the Atelier series.

A sequel, titled Atelier Ryza 2: Lost Legends & the Secret Fairy, was released on December 3, 2020 in Japan, and in January 2021 in North America and Europe for PlayStation 4, PlayStation 5 and Nintendo Switch, with a Microsoft Windows version being released in same month for all regions. A second sequel, titled Atelier Ryza 3: Alchemist of the End & the Secret Key, is scheduled to release for Microsoft Windows, Nintendo Switch, PlayStation 4, and PlayStation 5 in February 2023.

An anime television series based on the game by Liden Films is scheduled to premiere in Q3 2023.

Gameplay
Atelier Ryza is a Japanese role-playing video game with a significant crafting component, called alchemy. In the combat portions of the game, battles utilize a modified turn-based combat system incorporating real-time elements. Time moves continuously while the player gives commands to the characters in the party. Attacks build Action Points which can be used to perform skills or special attacks, or to raise the party's Tactics Level which gives access to more powerful abilities.

Outside of combat, the game revolves around alchemy. This involves gathering resources while out in the field, and placing them onto a field of elemental nodes to discover new recipes and create a wide variety of usable items. New to the series in Atelier Ryza is the ability to automate gathering and item synthesis for players that are more interested in the other aspects of the game.

Plot
Reisalin "Ryza" Stout is a girl living on Kurken Island who is eager to have her own adventures. One day she sneaks onto the mainland by boat with her friends Lent Marslink and Tao Mongarten, where they meet and befriend Klaudia Valentz, a merchant's daughter. The four are ambushed by a monster and rescued by the alchemist Empel Vollmer and his bodyguard Lila Decyrus. Impressed with Empel and Lila's skills, Ryza, Tao and Lent convince the duo to accept them as apprentices. Empel starts teaching Ryza the basics of alchemy and helping with Tao's studies while Lent begins combat training with Lila. As the trio improves, they restore an abandoned cottage in the forest, which becomes Ryza's atelier and their base of operations on the mainland. Klaudia later joins the party in their adventures after earning her father's approval.

Distraught by Ryza and her friends' achievements, her estranged childhood friend Bos Brunnen conspires to falsely implicate Empel and Lila for all the trouble on the island, with help from his father Moritz, who is wary of their investigations into the local ruins and wants them banished. Their scheme fails after Empel executes a plan to prove their innocence and Bos flees from home. The party chases Bos down all the way to a gate which leads to an alternate realm called the "Underworld", where they find him under the care of Kilo, who, like Lila, is a member of the local Oren race, which is fighting a losing war against a powerful horde of insectoid monsters known as the "Philuscha". In the incident, it is revealed that the local water supply was stolen centuries ago by the ancient Klint Kingdom, allowing the Philuscha to ravage the land unchallenged, with Empel and Lila traveling together to seal all gates to stop them from attacking other realms. Bos realizes that the water is stored in a magic orb in possession of his father, and ashamed of his and his family's mistakes, Bos reforms and decides to help the party. Some time later, Ryza and Bos clear up a misunderstanding from their childhood that led to them start avoiding each other and they reconcile.

Back to their world, Ryza and her friends discover that the Klint Kingdom was destroyed by a Philuscha invasion and the survivors took refuge on Kurken Island, which is actually a man-made structure, making them their descendants. They also learn that the island is in danger because the machinery that keeps it afloat is failing due to lack of maintenance. After making some emergency repairs on the island, the party returns to the Underworld to stop another invasion by the Philuscha, succeeding after defeating their leader, the Ravaging Queen. Ryza uses the magic stone taken from the Ravaging Queen's body to finish the island's repairs and Bos destroys the orb to return the stolen water and drive away the rest of the Philuscha swarm. The party celebrates their victory at Ryza's atelier before going their separate ways. Lent becomes a knight-errant, Tao and Bos leave to study in the capital, Klaudia continues traveling with her father, while Empel and Lila resume their quest to seal the gates to the Underworld, and Ryza stays on the island to make preparations to one day make her own journey alone.

Release
The game released in Japan on September 26, 2019, in North America on October 29, 2019 and November 1, 2019 for other regions. The PlayStation 4 and the Nintendo Switch versions had physical releases while the Microsoft Windows version was exclusively released on Steam. The console versions are also distributed via Nintendo eShop and PlayStation Store.

Reception

Upon release, Atelier Ryza received "generally favorable" reviews on all platforms, according to review aggregator Metacritic. PJ O'Reilly of Nintendo Life wrote that the game "lifts the series to new heights" with its combat overhaul. Regarding the redesigned alchemy system, he thought the traditional depth of crafting in the Atelier series was balanced by a streamlined experience. He also recognized the game for its emotional narrative and strong main characters, though found fault with slow pacing in the early parts of the game and tedious side missions.

 the game sold 500,000 copies, making it the best-selling title in the series. As of September 14, 2022, the Atelier Ryza series has sold over 1.3 million units.

The game was nominated for "Best Character" with Reisalin Stout at the Famitsu Dengeki Game Awards 2019.

Other media

A manga adaptation of the game illustrated by Riichu began serialization in Kadokawa Game Linkage's Shūkan Famitsū magazine on September 17, 2020.

An anime television series adaptation of the game was announced on March 19, 2023. It will be animated by Liden Films and directed by Ema Yuzuhira, with Yashichiro Takahashi and Kazuki Yanagawa reprising their roles from the game as script writer and composer. It is set to premiere in Q3 2023.

Notes

References

External links
 
 
  

2019 video games
2023 anime television series debuts
Anime television series based on video games
R
Gust Corporation games
Japanese role-playing video games
Koei Tecmo games
Liden Films
Nintendo Switch games
PlayStation 4 games
Upcoming anime television series
Video games developed in Japan
Video games featuring female protagonists
Windows games